This is a list of diplomatic missions in South Africa. There are 134 embassies and high commissions in Pretoria, and many countries maintain either an embassy, high commission or consulate in Cape Town and consulates in other South African cities (not including honorary consulates).

Diplomatic missions in Pretoria

Embassies and High Commissions

Other missions or delegations 
 (Delegation)
 (Liaison Office)

Gallery

Embassies and Consulates-General 
Many countries have either an embassy or high commission (used during the Parliamentary Session) or a consulate general in Cape Town.

Cape Town
 

 (Consulate-General) 

 (Consulate)
 (Consular office)

 (Consulate-General)

 (Liaison Office)

 (Consulate)

Durban
 
 
 
 (Consulate)

Johannesburg
 
 
 
 
 
 
 
 
 
 
 (Consulate-General)
 

 
 

Klerksdorp, North West
 (Consulate)

Mbombela, Mpumalanga
 (Consulate)

Welkom, Free State
 (Consulate)

Non-resident embassies and high commissions 

Resident in London unless otherwise noted. 

  (Cairo)
  
 
  (Khartoum)
 
  (Singapore)
  
  (New Delhi)
  (Luanda)
  (New Delhi)
  (Nairobi)
  
  (Tel Aviv)
  (New York City)
  (Luanda)
 (Rabat)
  (New Delhi)
  (Riyadh)
  (New Delhi)
  (Bern)
  (Colombo)
  (Valletta)
  (Cairo)
  (Managua)
  
  (Addis Ababa)
  (Canberra)
  
  
  (San Marino)
  
  (Nur-Sultan)
  (Cairo)
  (Abu Dhabi)
  (Wellington)
  (Ankara)
  (Canberra)

Closed missions

Missions to open
 (Embassy)

See also 
 Foreign relations of South Africa
 Visa requirements for South African citizens

References

External links 
 South African Ministry of Foreign Affairs
 Diplomatic list

Foreign relations of South Africa
Diplomatic missions
South Africa